Jack Beresford Fowler (21 July 1893 – 17 July 1972), generally referred to as Beresford Fowler or J. Beresford Fowler, was an Australian actor and stage director, remembered for his little theatre productions in Melbourne.

History
Fowler was born in Darlinghurst or Ultimo, Sydney, youngest of four sons of musician Frank Harry Fowler (c. 1857 – 9 December 1893) and Fannie Adele Fowler, née Ellard (c. 1861 – 10 August 1928), better known as the actress Ethel Adele, whose sister Ada Kate Ellard married Garnet Walch.

He was only a few months old when his father died, and his mother, though not well provided for, brought up her four boys on her own. In 1896 she took her sons to live in Melbourne, living in various suburbs — Elsternwick, Brighton, Armadale and Hawksburn — taking in boarders and supplementing whatever income by producing Gilbert & Sullivan operettas for high schools. She also appeared on stage for Gregan McMahon, so Jack got to see many stage productions, albeit involuntarily. One of his earliest memories was of Bert Royle's pantomime Djin Djin starring Florrie Young at the Princess Theatre in 1896. He was quite deaf, so had no talents as a singer.
He was educated at Hawksburn State School (closed 1993), and after leaving found employment as a dentist's assistant.

Fowler got a start in theatre with Gregan McMahon's amateur company 1911–1914, playing alongside medical student F. Kingsley Norris in various dramas, notably as Foldal in Ibsen's John Gabriel Borkman. On one occasion they shared the stage with Nellie Melba. Other notable amateurs with McMahon around that time were Doris Fitton, Jack Cussen, son of Judge Cussen, and Louie Dunn, teacher of Irene Mitchell.

In 1911 Bert Bailey, Edmund Duggan and Julius Grant combined to form the Bert Bailey Dramatic Company, and leased King's Theatre from William Anderson, and Fowler joined the company. He played Billy Bearup in a touring production of On Our Selection and back at King's Theatre in The Squaw Man on 22 April 1916.

He was living with his mother at 94 Hotham Street, East St Kilda, Victoria when he enlisted with the First AIF in April 1916, and served as a private in France, returning to Australia in 1919.
He rejoined Bailey. In 1923 he joined Allan Wilkie's company, playing in Macbeth, A Midsummer Night's Dream, Henry V, and others.

Meanwhile he assembled an independent amateur company, who performed Darnley's comedy Facing the Music from 8 January 1921 at The Playhouse. Audience included members of the 3rd Battalion Pioneers Ibsen's Ghosts followed on 27 September 1922.

He became associated with the Australian Institute of Arts and Literature (1921–1927), a Melbourne club for the Arts élite whose existence rose and fell with the presidency of Sir Robert Garran. A dramatic group was formed within the organisation which, led by Fowler, presented several dramas, one at the clubroom above or adjacent the Palace Theatre overlooking Bourke Street, and another at The Playhouse. The Institute appears not to have sponsored any further productions after 1922.

In 1925, with no backing and £100 from his own savings, Fowler founded The Little Art Theatre Company, often referred to as the Little Art Company or Little Art Theatre. For four years they kept up a heavy schedule of challenging productions, mostly on the minuscule Queen's Hall stage, to generally warm praise from critics.
In 1929 they turned professional, with Fowler and Dudley Riddick (who had been with the company several years) as joint directors, and business manager Laurence Walter, as The Art Theatre Players, and that February opened in Hobart. The travelling cast was four men and four women, with Berta Howden pianist. Despite good reviews the tour was a financial failure.

Other interests
He was a prominent member of the Play Lovers' Club, which read Chekhov's The Seagull in August 1926.

Fowler produced plays for other amateur groups, — Sunset by Jerome K. Jerome for the Old Wesley Collegians' Dramatic Society

He produced W. W. Jacobs' The Warming Pan as a radio play on station 3LO in 1930.

He helped found a repertory theatre in Bendigo 1930.

In 1932 he produced plays at Ballarat.

He has been credited as founder and conductor of the Brisbane Liedertafel.

As playwright
In 1910 Fowler wrote a play about Robert Clive, which he sent to Gerard Coventry, a producer for J. C. Williamson's, which was not accepted, nor was his second, a dramatization of The Count of Monte Cristo. Coventry again returned the manuscript, with the advice to "persevere . . . and never give up or lose heart".

In 1920 he registered his play The Dame of Corbie for copyright purposes.

At an all-Australian programme 12 April 1928 he staged his own A Heroine of Russia (1916)

Greater Love, a "comedy-drama of the war, the stage and school life", loosely adapted from his own novel, The Elusive Ideal.

A Suit of Clothes, play adapted from his own short story.

Assessments
Everyone with a knowledge of the theatre is aware that the producer's skill or the lack of it makes or mars the play. To obtain a right effect at the right moment is part of the producer's job. To obtain a well-balanced ensemble is another . . . How Mr Fowler works his miracles at the Queen's Hall is beyond my comprehension. Almost as well attempt Hamlet in a Punch and Judy theatre.

Notes and references 

1893 births
1972 deaths
Australian theatre directors
Male actors from Sydney
Male actors from Melbourne
Australian male stage actors
People from St Kilda, Victoria
Australian dramatists and playwrights
Australian military personnel of World War I
Military personnel from Melbourne